Björn Ferry (born 1 August 1978 in Stensele, Storuman, Västerbotten) is a former Swedish biathlete and medal winning Olympian. He began competing internationally in World Cup competitions in 2001, but did not win his first international race until the 2007–2008 season. In 2007, he won gold in the mixed relay event at the Biathlon World Championships. The next year, at his third Winter Olympics appearance, he won the gold medal in the pursuit event. He started the event in 8th place as determined by the previous sprint event, but managed to overtake the race leader on the final lap.

Career
Ferry debuted in the World Cup in Hochfilzen in 2001, and earned his first World Cup points after only skiing three races. He finished his first season ranked 36th in World Cup standings. In World Cup competition, he slowly improved his ranking, and by the 2006–2007 season was ranked in the top ten worldwide. His first Olympic appearance, at the 2002 Winter Olympics in Salt Lake City, Utah, was disappointing, but four years later at the 2006 Games in Turin, Italy he was a member of a Swedish relay team that placed fourth, just off the medal stand.

Ferry has seen some of his strongest efforts and best finishes in Italy, even beyond the 2006 success. His first two World Cup victories both came in the pursuit in Antholz-Anterselva, in the 2007–2008 and 2008–2009 seasons. In 2007, he won a gold medal in the mixed relay in the 2007 World Championships alongside Helena Jonsson, Anna Carin Olofsson, and Carl Johan Bergman. Although his 2009–2010 season was lackluster, and Ferry saw his ranking drop from 9th to 16th place in the World Cup, Ferry was again selected for the Swedish team for the 2010 Olympic Games in Vancouver, British Columbia, Canada. In the pursuit event held on February 16, Ferry finished in first place, winning the gold medal after catching and passing the race leader on the final lap of the race. He beat second-place finisher Christoph Sumann of Austria by only 16.5 seconds. The victory marked the first Olympic biathlon gold for a Swedish athlete in a half-century.

Ferry practices with the Storuman IK club. His personal coach was German Wolfgang Pichler until Pichler left his role as coach of the Swedish biathlon team in 2010. He subsequently described the atmosphere in the team under Pichler as being like a cult, although he praised Pichler for the energy he brought to the role.

In March 2014, Ferry confirmed that he would be retiring from the sport at the end of the 2013–14 season.

Opposition to doping
Ferry has been outspoken in his opposition to the use of banned substances by athletes who participate in international competition, a practice known as doping. In 2009, he was quoted referring to Russian athletes who had used such substances as 'idiots' and received a number of death threats. During the 2010 winter Olympics, he was quoted saying he would not mind if athletes who use banned substances would get the death penalty or, "at least lots of kicks in the balls." Further comments referred to dopers as people with low moral standards and suggested that the problem of use of banned substances in sport would not go away until more severe penalties were imposed.

Personal life
Ferry is married to arm wrestler Heidi Andersson, who has won multiple world championships in arm wrestling. In November 2017, he announced he'd given up flying because of the environment.

In March and April 2018, SVT aired programme series Storuman Forever, depicting the Heidi Andersson and Björn Ferry couple's climate engagement.

Flygskam, translating as ‘Flight Shame’, or ‘Flight Conscience’, a social pressure not to fly because of the rising greenhouse gas emissions of the airline industry, was originally championed by Björn Ferry but has since gained considerable momentum after Thunberg’s refusal to fly on environmental grounds. Sweden has reported a 4% drop in domestic travel for 2019 and a 9% increase in rail use. The BBC claims that the movement could halve the growth of global air travel, but Airbus and Boeing claim that it will continue to grow at around  4% until 2035.

Biathlon results
All results are sourced from the International Biathlon Union.

Olympic Games
1 medal (1 gold)

*Mass start was added as an event in 2006, with the mixed relay being added in 2014.

World Championships
3 medals (1 gold, 1 silver, 1 bronze)

*During Olympic seasons competitions are only held for those events not included in the Olympic program.
**The mixed relay was added as an event in 2005.

Individual victories
7 victories (2 Sp, 4 Pu, 1 MS)

*Results are from UIPMB and IBU races which include the Biathlon World Cup, Biathlon World Championships and the Winter Olympic Games.

Cross-country skiing results

All results are sourced from the International Ski Federation (FIS).

World Cup

Season standings

References

External links
 
2001 interview with Björn Ferry 

1978 births
Living people
People from Storuman Municipality
Swedish male biathletes
Biathletes at the 2002 Winter Olympics
Biathletes at the 2006 Winter Olympics
Biathletes at the 2010 Winter Olympics
Biathletes at the 2014 Winter Olympics
Olympic biathletes of Sweden
Medalists at the 2010 Winter Olympics
Olympic medalists in biathlon
Olympic gold medalists for Sweden
Biathlon World Championships medalists
People from Stensele